The Maio Island Cup (Portuguese: Taça (Copa) da Ilha do Maio, Capeverdean Crioulo, ALUPEC or ALUPEK: Tasa da Idja du Maio or Tasa da Djarmaiu, Maio Creole: Taça d' Djarmai) is a  regional cup competition and is played during the season in the island of Maio, Cape Verde, it consists of all the clubs from all the two regional divisions and are divided into about three rounds, for some seasons, a group stage was featured.  The cup competition is organized by the Maio Regional Football Association (Associação Regional do Maio, ARFM). The cup winner competes in the regional super cup final in the following season when a cup winner also wins the championship, a runner-up competes.  For several seasons, the winner qualified into Cape Verdean Cup which has been cancelled due to financial and scheduling reasons.

Its current cup winner is Onze Unidos who recently won two straight titles.

Up to 2014, it had seven clubs, for some seasons, five were active, the additional four made it to 11 in 2016 and the addition of Santa Clara in 2017 would it had it to 12, the withdrawal of Beira-Mar kept it at 11. It finally had 12 clubs for the 2017-18 season, the season also had started from group stage, divided into two groups and a club had one meeting, the top two advanced into the semis.

Winners

Performance By Club

Performance by area

See also
Maio Premier Division
Maio Second Division
Maio Super Cup
Maio Opening Tournament
Maio Champion's Cup

References

External links
Maio Regional Football Association which includes the Maio Cup 

Sport in Maio, Cape Verde
Football cup competitions in Cape Verde
2007 establishments in Cape Verde
Recurring sporting events established in 2007